Methyltransferase 2 may refer to:
 (Methyl-Co(III) methanol-specific corrinoid protein):coenzyme M methyltransferase
 (Methyl-Co(III) methylamine-specific corrinoid protein):coenzyme M methyltransferase
 (Methyl-Co(III) tetramethylammonium-specific corrinoid protein):coenzyme M methyltransferase